Murder in the Submarine Zone (also published as Nine—And Death Makes Ten and Murder in the Atlantic) is a mystery novel by the American writer John Dickson Carr, who published it under the name of Carter Dickson.  It is a whodunnit and features the series detective Sir Henry Merrivale.

Plot summary

Nine oddly-assorted passengers aboard the S.S. Edwardic are crossing the Atlantic during World War II, with the constant threat of attack by German submarines.  When one passenger is murdered, apparently for a military secret, Sir Henry Merrivale must solve the mystery.  But can he contend with the fact that the killer's fingerprint doesn't match anybody on the ship?

Literary significance and criticism
according to  Jacques Barzun  and Wendell Hertig Taylor, the novel is:"One of the author's most straightforward stories.  The action ... consists in finding out who murdered whom for a military secret -- except that the motive takes an unexpected turn.  The several characters are well differentiated and suspicion fairly distributed.  Shipboard life in the blackout is especially well done."

References

1940 American novels
Novels by John Dickson Carr
Novels set during World War II
William Morrow and Company books